"Oh, People" is a song by American singer Patti LaBelle. It was written by Andy Goldmark and Bruce Roberts for her eighth studio album Winner in You (1986), while production was helmed by Richard Perry. Issued as the album's second single, it was released by MCA Records on June 30, 1986 in the United States. The song is a socially conscious anthem with lyrics pleading to individuals to unite and "build the world we want together."

Chart performance
The song was a moderate success, reaching number 29 on the Billboard Hot 100 chart and number 7 on the Billboard R&B chart while also reaching number 26 in the United Kingdom. It also reached several European charts peaking at number 31 in the Netherlands (AKA the Dutch singles chart) and number 36 in New Zealand.

Track listing

Credits and personnel 
Credits adapted from the liner notes of Winner in You.

Patti LaBelle – executive producer 
Andy Goldmark – associate producer, writer
Richard Perry – producer
Bruce Roberts – associate producer, writer

Charts

References 

1980s ballads
1986 songs
1986 singles
Patti LaBelle songs
MCA Records singles
Song recordings produced by Richard Perry
Songs written by Bruce Roberts (singer)
Pop ballads
Songs written by Andy Goldmark